Joseph Lorenzo Jr. Welbon (born May 9, 1964), known by the stage name Joe Smooth, is an American house music producer and DJ who gained international acclaim during the late 1980s and early 1990s. By the new millennium he held the reputation of working with acts like Destiny's Child, Ludacris, New Order, Whitney Houston, and many others across genres. He is often credited as essential to the creation of house music as a genre and became an influence to major groups like Daft Punk, who often remixed Smooth's music during early live shows.

Smooth has earned gold and platinum record awards for his work. In 2015 he started his own record label, Indie Art Music, focusing on producing pop in all genres and all areas of the music industry.

Biography

Early life
Smooth was a self-taught musician and started creating original music at the age of 12. During his teenage years, he began to make a name for himself as a DJ in the underground Chicago house-music scene. He is credited as essential to the creation of house music as a genre and the revival of the culture surrounding it. During his 20s he became an essential DJ for any viable club in Chicago.

Career
Smooth gained international acclaim with the release of his late 1980s tracks "Promised Land" (featuring Anthony Thomas), "They Want to be Free," and "I Try." He is best known for "Promised Land," which spoke of how humans, as brothers and sisters, should unite in love and thrive in paradise. Joe Smooth's song has been covered several times and is still played today. Originally released in 1987, it peaked at No. 56 in the UK Singles Chart in February 1989, following the Top 40 success of a cover version by The Style Council. An album of the same title became available in 1988, and a music video was produced for the single. A follow-up album, Rejoice, was released in 1990, which featured the hit single "They Want to be Free."

Smooth helped influence a decade of house and dance music elements in mainstream pop throughout the 1990s.

By the new millennium he was approached to work with many pop, R&B, and other genre icons such as Destiny's Child, Whitney Houston, and Cisqo.

In October 2004, "Promised Land" appeared in the video game Grand Theft Auto: San Andreas.  Within the game, the song could be heard playing on the fictional House Music radio station SF-UR.

He later launched his own record label Indie Art Music. The label has recently announced an upcoming song with Benny Benassi and other notable producers and artists. Indie Art Music set out with the goal of creating mainstream music in all genres with the ability to distribute, market, publish, and produce all within one single company. While the focus is on mainstream areas of the industry, Indie Art Music is currently developing and working with new artists like Amy DB of Chicago, Greg Tanoose of Austin, among others. 
He continues to work with his label as the CEO, manager, and executive producer, while still releasing music of his own.

Current work
Smooth is a musician and producer, who has worked as a remixer, producer, engineer, and writer. He has earned gold and platinum record awards for his work, work behind the scenes with Grammy award-winning artists. Notable artists he has worked with include Bros, Whitney Houston, Donnell Jones, Destiny's Child, Sisqó, Frankie Knuckles, Marshall Jefferson, A Guy Called Gerald, Lil Louis, D'Bora, Tyree Cooper, Fast Eddie, Fingers Inc., Art of Noise, Sterling Void, Pet Shop Boys, Janet Jackson, the Style Council, New Order, and Steve Hurley. He launched a new record label in 2015, Indie Art Music, and has topped digital charts Traxsource and Beatport for song sales.

References

External links
 Official website
 Discography

Musicians from Chicago
DJs from Chicago
House musicians
American house musicians
Living people
1963 births